Lynn Creek may refer to:

Lynn Creek (Wisconsin)
Lynn Creek (Texas)